The 2018–19 season was Al-Ahli's 43rd consecutive season in the top flight of Saudi football and 81st year in existence as a football club. Along with the Pro League, the club competed in the King Cup, Arab Club Champions Cup, and the Champions League. The season covers the period from 1 July 2018 to 30 June 2019.

Players

Squad information

Transfers

In

Summer

Winter

Out

Summer

Winter

Loan out

Summer

Winter

Pre-season and friendlies

Competitions

Overview

Goalscorers

Last Updated: 20 May 2019

Assists

Last Updated: 20 May 2019

Clean sheets

Last Updated: 16 May 2019

References

Al-Ahli Saudi FC seasons
Ahli